This is a list of airports in Mozambique, sorted by location.



Airports 

Airport names shown in bold indicate the airport has scheduled service on commercial airlines.

See also 
 Transport in Mozambique
 List of airports by ICAO code: F#FQ - Mozambique
 Wikipedia: WikiProject Aviation/Airline destination lists: Africa#Mozambique

References 
 
  - includes IATA codes
 Great Circle Mapper: Airports in Mozambique - IATA and ICAO codes
 World Aero Data: Mozambique - ICAO codes and coordinates

Mozambique
 
Airports
Airports
Mozambique